PSLV-C38 was the 40th mission of the Indian Polar Satellite Launch Vehicle (PSLV) program and its 17th mission in the XL configuration. PSLV-C38 successfully carried and deployed 31 satellites in Sun-synchronous orbit. It was launched on 23 June 2017 by the Indian Space Research Organisation (ISRO) from the Satish Dhawan Space Centre at Sriharikota, Andhra Pradesh.

Payload and other parameters 
Satellites of Belgium, Chile, the Czech Republic VZLUSat-1, Finland, France, Germany, Italy, Latvia, Lithuania, Slovakia SkCube, and the United Kingdom were also launched.

The work on the satellite began in 2007 and cost  with help from ISRO. It was conceived by University's chancellor A. P. Majeed Khan post 2004 Indian Ocean tsunami disaster.

Minister of State in the Prime Minister's Office Jitendra Singh stated that ISRO earned 45.2 crore (EUR 6.1 million) from launching foreign satellites on PSLV-C38.

References

External links 
 PSLV-C38 / Cartosat-2 Series Satellite ISRO

Polar Satellite Launch Vehicle
Spacecraft launched by India in 2017